John Ince (born ) is a Canadian author, lawyer, entrepreneur and from 2005 to 2012 activist in the sex-positive movement.

Books
Ince’s latest book (2022) is Cannabis The New Way: how I found a powerful tool for a happier life and planet. It challenges the conventional attitude that cannabis is inferior to psychedelics as a transformational agent, and proposes methods to use the plant not for recreation or medicine but to foster personal development and wellbeing.

His 2015 book Joyshift: the journey to primal happiness argues that the ingredients for happiness were genetically set in the hunter-gatherer era, and proposes a daily practice to make use of these "primal nutrients of happiness" in modern-day life.

Ince worked on and off for almost twenty years researching his 2005 publication The Politics of Lust, (Prometheus Books) which argues that irrational sexual fear is pervasive in our culture, that it is largely unrecognized, and that it affects our political orientation. 

In 1993 Ince wrote The BC Guide to Buying Rural and Recreational Property. It is the only detailed guide to the process of acquiring property outside cities in British Columbia.

He co-authored Sea Kayaking Canada’s West Coast with Hedi Kottner in 1982. It was in print for 20 years and was the first paddling guide to the sport of ocean kayaking.

Ince's first two books concerned the then emerging field of environmental law. Both Environmental Law and Land Use Law were first published by the West Coast Environmental Law Association and then by the legal publisher Butterworths.

Legal career
Ince began practicing law in the early 1980s focusing on environmental issues but gradually moved to the human rights field, specializing in sexual issues. He represented performers and individual citizens fighting sexual censorship laws. One of his cases, Luscher v. Canada successfully struck down as unconstitutional a federal law that for over one hundred years had prohibited sexual material from entering Canada. He represented the Canadian polyamory community in the 2011 constitutional reference case concerning Canada’s polygamy laws.

Sex-positive activism
In 2002, Ince opened The Art of Loving, a sex shop in Vancouver, Canada It sells art, instructional books and videos and pleasure products. It also produces sexual seminars, some led by Ince. He produced an erotic event at The Art of Loving that garnered international media attention in 2003.

In 2005 Ince and many other erotic arts activists founded The Sex Party, the world’s first officially registered sex-positive political party. Ince was party leader from 2005 until 2012. He and others ran as candidates in two provincial general elections in 2005 and 2009.

References 

1952 births
21st-century Canadian lawyers
British Columbia political party leaders
Canadian non-fiction writers
Living people
Sex positivism
Writers from British Columbia